David Charles "Kale" Browne (born June 16, 1950) is an American actor. He was born in San Rafael, California. Browne was the first to play the roles of Michael Hudson on Another World (1986–1993, 1995–1998) and Sam Rappaport on One Life to Live (1998–2001). Browne has a son, Nicholas, with former wife Karen Allen, to whom he was married from 1988 to 1998.

Filmography

Film

Television

Video games

External links

1950 births
Living people
American male television actors
American male soap opera actors
Actors from San Rafael, California

People from San Rafael, California
People from Marin County, California
Actors from California
Male actors from California